This is a list of Chinese football transfers for the 2021 season summer transfer window.

Super League

Beijing Guoan

In:

Out:

Cangzhou Mighty Lions

In:

Out:

Changchun Yatai

In:

Out:

Chongqing Liangjiang Athletic

In:

Out:

Dalian Pro

In:

Out:

Guangzhou

In:

Out:

Guangzhou City

In:

Out:

Hebei

In:

Out:

Henan Songshan Longmen

In:

Out:

Qingdao

In:

Out:

Shandong Taishan

In:

Out:

Shanghai Port

In:

Out:

Shanghai Shenhua

In:

Out:

Shenzhen

In:

Out:

Tianjin Jinmen Tiger

In:

Out:

Wuhan

In:

Out:

League One

Beijing BIT

In:

Out:

Beijing BSU

In:

Out:

Chengdu Rongcheng

In:

Out:

Guizhou

In:

Out:

Heilongjiang Ice City

In:

Out:

Jiangxi Beidamen

In:

Out:

Kunshan

In:

Out:

Liaoning Shenyang Urban

In:

Out:

Meizhou Hakka

In:

Out:

Nanjing City

In:

Out:

Nantong Zhiyun

In:

Out:

Shaanxi Chang'an Athletic

In:

Out:

Sichuan Jiuniu

In:

Out:

Suzhou Dongwu

In:

Out:

Wuhan Three Towns

In:

Out:

Xinjiang Tianshan Leopard

In:

Out:

Zhejiang

In:

Out:

Zibo Cuju

In:

Out:

League Two

Dandong Tengyue

In:

Out:

Dongguan United

In:

Out:

Guangxi Pingguo Haliao

In:

Out:

Hebei Kungfu

In:

Out:

Hebei Zhuoao

In:

Out:

Hubei Istar

In:

Out:

Hunan Billows

In:

Out:

Inner Mongolia Caoshangfei

In:

Out:

Kunming Zheng He Shipman

In:

Out:

Qingdao Hainiu

In:

Out:

Qingdao Red Lions

In:

Out:

Qingdao Youth Island

In:

Out:

Quanzhou Yassin

In:

Out:

Shaanxi Warriors Beyond

In:

Out:

Shanghai Jiading Huilong

In:

Out:

Shanxi Longjin

In:

Out:

Shaoxing Keqiao Yuejia

In:

Out:

Sichuan Minzu

In:

Out:

Wuxi Wugou

In:

Out:

Xi'an Wolves

In:

Out:

Xiamen Egret Island

In:

Out:

Yanbian Longding

In:

Out:

Yichun Grand Tiger

In:

Out:

Notes

References

2021
China